Mount Temple can have the following meanings:

Mount Temple (Alberta), a mountain in the Canadian Rockies
Mount Temple, a peak of the Enchantment Peaks in the Stuart Range, Washington, United States
Mount Temple, County Westmeath, a village in County Westmeath, Ireland
Mount Temple Comprehensive School, a secondary school in Dublin, Ireland
Baron Mount Temple, a title in the peerage of the United Kingdom
William Cowper-Temple, 1st Baron Mount Temple
Georgina Cowper-Temple, Lady Mount Temple
Wilfrid Ashley, 1st Baron Mount Temple
Muriel Ashley, Lady Mount Temple
SS Mount Temple, a ship owned by Canadian Pacific Lines, which was near the RMS Titanic at the time of its sinking.
Temple Mount, a religious site in the Old City of Jerusalem
Temple Mountain, a mountain in New Hampshire

See also
Temple (disambiguation)